{| class="infobox" width=330
|-
| align="center" |  '1869 in New Zealand: 
|- style="background-color:#f3f3f3"
| align="center" | Other years in New Zealand 
|-
| align="center" | 1866 | 1867 | 1868 | 1869 | 1870 | 1871 | 1872
|}
The following lists events that happened during 1869 in New Zealand.

Incumbents

Regal and viceregal
Head of State — Queen Victoria
Governor — Sir George Ferguson Bowen

Government and law
The 4th Parliament continues.

Speaker of the House — Sir David Monro
Premier — Edward Stafford is replaced by William Fox on 28 June after Stafford's government is defeated.
Minister of Finance — William Fitzherbert is replaced by Julius Vogel after the defeat of the Stafford government.
Chief Justice — Hon Sir George Arney

Main centre leaders
Mayor of Christchurch — William Wilson followed by John Anderson
Mayor of Dunedin — Thomas Birch

 Events 

 4–5 January: Te Kooti and his followers manage to escape the siege of Ngā Tapa pā.Dictionary Of New Zealand Biography: Te Kooti
 13 February: A war party of Ngāti Maniapoto led by Wetere Te Rerenga kills all three men, a woman and three children, and also the Wesleyan missionary John Whiteley who arrives shortly afterwards, at the isolated Pukearuhe Redoubt. This is the final act of the Taranaki wars.
 11 April: Prince Alfred the Duke of Edinburgh visits New Zealand on HMS Galatea.
 5 June: 1869 Christchurch earthquake 
 August: The first bicycle built in Auckland is ridden for the first time. Bicycles are also built and ridden in Christchurch and Dunedin in this year.
 The University of Otago is established, being New Zealand's first University.

Undated
The New Zealand Ensign is introduced for use on government ships. It does not become the official national flag until 1902. The flag of the United Tribes of New Zealand is also in common use.
Resignation and departure from New Zealand of Jean Baptiste Pompallier, First Catholic Bishop in New Zealand.
Closure of St Mary's Seminary, Auckland.

Sport

Horse racing

Major race winners
New Zealand Cup winner: Mainsail
New Zealand Derby winner: Manuka

Shooting
Ballinger Belt: No competition

Births

 6 February: Patrick O'Regan, lawyer, politician and judge.
 28 April: Frances Hodgkins, painter.
 30 April: 'Charles Robert Norris Mackie, pacifist and social reformer
 18 May: James Parr, politician.

Deaths
 16 March: Johnny Jones, whaler, early settler.
 30 March: William Field Porter, politician. 
 Āpihai Te Kawau''', Māori leader.

See also
History of New Zealand
List of years in New Zealand
Military history of New Zealand
Timeline of New Zealand history
Timeline of New Zealand's links with Antarctica
Timeline of the New Zealand environment

References
General
 Romanos, J. (2001) New Zealand Sporting Records and Lists.'' Auckland: Hodder Moa Beckett. 
Specific

External links